The abyssal zone or abyssopelagic zone is a layer of the pelagic zone of the ocean. "Abyss" derives from the Greek word , meaning bottomless. It covers 83% of the total area of the ocean and 60% of Earth's surface. The abyssal zone has temperatures around  through the large majority of its mass. Due to there being no light, there are no plants producing oxygen, which instead primarily comes from ice that had melted long ago from the polar regions. The water along the seafloor of this zone is actually devoid of oxygen, resulting in a death trap for organisms unable to quickly return to the oxygen-enriched water above. This region also contains a much higher concentration of nutrient salts, like nitrogen, phosphorus, and silica, due to the large amount of dead organic material that drifts down from the above ocean zones and decomposes. The water pressure can reach up to 76 megapascal.

The area below the abyssal zone is the sparsely inhabited hadal zone. The zone above is the bathyal zone.

Trenches

The deep trenches or fissures that plunge down thousands of meters below the ocean floor (for example, the mid-oceanic trenches such as the Mariana Trench in the Pacific) are almost unexplored. Previously, only the bathyscaphe Trieste, the remote control submarine Kaikō and the Nereus have been able to descend to these depths. However, as of March 25, 2012 one vehicle, the Deepsea Challenger was able to penetrate to a depth of 10,898.4 meters (35,756 ft).

Ecosystem 
The relative sparsity of primary producers means that the majority of organisms living in the abyssal zone depend on the marine snow that falls from oceanic layers above. The biomass of the abyssal zone actually increases near the seafloor as most of the decomposing material and decomposers rest on the seabed.

The composition of the abyssal plain depends on the depth of the sea floor. Above 4000 meters the seafloor usually consists of calcareous shells of foraminifera, zooplankton, and phytoplankton. At depths greater than 4000 meters shells dissolve, leaving behind a seafloor of brown clay and  silica from dead zooplankton and phytoplankton. Chemosynthetic bacteria support large and diverse communities near hydrothermal vents, filling a similar role in these ecosystems as plants do in the sunlit regions above.

Biological adaptations 

Organisms that live at this depth have had to evolve to overcome challenges provided by the abyssal zone. Fish and invertebrates had to evolve to withstand the sheer cold and intense pressure found at this level. They also had to not only find ways to hunt and survive in constant darkness but to thrive in an ecosystem that has less oxygen and biomass, energy sources or prey items, than the upper zones. To survive in a region with so few resources and low temperatures, many fish and other organisms developed a much slower metabolism and require much less oxygen than those in upper zones. Many animals  also move very slowly to conserve energy. Their reproduction rates are also very slow, to decrease competition and conserve energy. Animals here typically have flexible stomachs and mouths so that when scarce food items are found they can consume as much as possible.

Other challenges faced by life in the abyssal zone are the pressure and darkness caused by the zone’s depth. Many organisms living in this zone have evolved to minimize internal air spaces, such as swim bladders. This adaptation helps to protect them from the extreme pressure, which can reach around 75 MPa (11,000 psi). The absence of light also spawned many different adaptations, such as having large eyes or the ability to produce their own light (bioluminescence). Large eyes would allow the detection and use of any light available, no matter how small. Commonly, animals in the abyssal zone are bioluminescent, producing blue light, because the blue wavelength of light is attenuated over greater travel distances than other wave lengths.  Due to this lack of light, complex designs and bright colors are not needed. Most fish species have evolved to be transparent, red, or black so they better blend in with the darkness and don't waste energy on developing and maintaining bright or complex designs.

Animals 
The abyssal zone is made up of many different types of organisms, including microorganisms, crustaceans, molluscan (bivalves, snails, and cephalopods), different classes of fishes, and possibly some animals that have yet to be discovered. Most of the fish species in this zone are characterized as demersal or benthopelagic fishes. Demersal fishes are a term that refers to fishes whose habitat is very close to (typically less than five meters) or on the seafloor. Most fish species fit into that classification because the seafloor contains most of the abyssal zone’s nutrients so the most complex food web or greatest biomass would be in this region of the zone. 

Organisms in the abyssal zone rely on the natural processes of higher ocean layers. When animals from higher ocean levels die, they occasionally drift down to the abyssal zone, where organisms in the deep can feed from. When a whale carcass falls down to the abyssal zone, this is called a Whale fall. The carcass of the whale can create complex ecosystems for organisms in the depths. 

For benthic organisms in the abyssal zone, species would need to have evolved morphological traits that could keep them out of oxygen-depleted water above the sea floor or a way to extract oxygen from the water above, but also, allow the animal access to the seafloor and the nutrients located there.  There are also animals that spend their time in the upper portion of the abyssal zone, and even sometimes spending time in the zone directly above, the bathyal zone. While there are a number of different fish species representing many different groups and classes, like Actinopterygii or ray-finned fish, there are no known members of the class Chondrichthyes, animals such as sharks, rays, and chimaeras, that make the abyssal zone their primary or constant habitat. Whether this is due to the limited resources, energy availability, or other physiological constraints is unknown. Most Chondrichthyes species only go as deep as the bathyal zone.      
Tripod fish (Bathypterois grallator): Their habitat is along the ocean floor, usually around 4,720 m below sea level. Their pelvic fins and caudal fin have long bony rays protruding from them. They face the current while standing still on their long rays. Once they sense food nearby, they use their large pectoral fins to hit the unsuspecting prey towards their mouth. Each member of this species has both male and female reproductive organs so that if a mate cannot be found, they can self fertilize. 
 Dumbo octopus: This octopus usually lives at a depth between 3,000 to 4,000 meters, deeper than any other known octopus. They use the fins on top of their head, which look like flapping ears, to hover over the sea floor looking for food. They use their arms to help change directions or crawl along the seafloor. To combat the intense pressure of the abyssal zone, this octopus species lost its ink sac during evolution. They also use their strand-like structured suction cups to help detect predators, food, and other aspects of their environment.
 Cusk eel (Genus Bassozetus): There are no known fish that live at depths greater than the cusk eel. The depth of the cusk eel habitat can be as great as 8,370 meters below sea level. This animal's ventral fins are specialized forked barbel-like organs that act as sensory organs. Cusk eels produce sounds to mate. Male cusk eels have two pairs of sonic muscles, while female cusk eels have three.
 Abyssal grenadier: This resident of the abyssal zone is known to live at a depth ranging from 800 and 4,000 meters. It has extremely large eyes, but a small mouth. It is thought to be a semelparous species, meaning it only reproduces once and then dies after. This is seen as a way for the organism to conserve energy and have a higher chance of having some healthy strong children. This reproductive strategy could be very useful in low energy environments such as the abyssal zone.
 Pseudoliparis swirei: the Mariana snailfish or Mariana hadal snailfish, is a species of snailfish found at hadal depths in the Mariana Trench in the western Pacific Ocean. It is known from a depth range of 6,198–8,076 m (20,335–26,496 ft), including a capture at 7,966 m (26,135 ft), which is possibly the record for a fish caught on the seafloor.

Environmental concerns  
As with all of the rest of the natural world climate change has negative effects. Due to the zone’s depth, increasing global temperatures do not affect it as quickly or drastically as the rest of the world, but the zone is still afflicted by ocean acidification. Along with climate change and ocean acidification, pollutants, such as plastics, are also present in this zone. Plastics are especially bad for the abyssal zone due to the fact that these organisms have evolved to eat or try to eat anything that moves or appears to be detritus, resulting in most organisms consuming plastics instead of nutrients. Both ocean acidification and pollution are decreasing the already small biomass that resides within the abyssal zone. Another problem caused by humans is overfishing. Even though no fishery can fish for organisms anywhere near the abyssal zone, they are still causing harm. The abyssal zone depends on dead organisms from the upper zones sinking to the seafloor, since their ecosystem lacks producers due to lack of sunlight. As fish and other animals are removed from the ocean, the frequency and amount of dead material reaching the abyssal zone decreases. A future problem for the abyssal zone could be deep sea mining operations. The talks and planning for this industry are already underway. This could be disastrous for this extremely fragile ecosystem since the ecological dangers from mining for deep sea minerals are many. Mining could increase the amount of pollution in not only the abyssal zone, but in the ocean as a whole, and would physically destroy habitats and the seafloor. This industry represents a looming threat to the abyssal zone and the rest of the ocean's inhabitants.

See also 

Abyssal plain
Beebe Hydrothermal Vent Field
Deep sea
Deep sea community
Deep-sea fish    
Mariana Trench

References 

Aquatic ecology
Marine biology
Oceanographical terminology